Elbjørg Fjære (12 May 1933 – 2 August 2021) was a Norwegian politician for the Progress Party.

She served as a deputy representative to the Parliament of Norway from Oslo during the terms 1973–1977 and 1981–1985. In total she met during 22 days of parliamentary session.

References

1933 births
2021 deaths
Politicians from Oslo
Deputy members of the Storting
Progress Party (Norway) politicians
Norwegian women in politics
Women members of the Storting